Double Trouble is the sixth studio album by Nigerian duo P-Square. It was released on 12 September 2014, by Square Records. The album features guest appearances from T.I., Don Jazzy, Awilo Longomba, Jermaine Jackson and Dave Scott. Its production was handled by Vtek, Charles Duke, Mecca and Oscar. The album yielded the singles "Alingo", "Personally", "Testimony", "Ejeajo", "Shekini" and "Bring It On".

Track listing

Personnel 

Paul and Peter Okoye – primary artists, executive producers, writers, performers
Jude Engees Okoye – management
Vtek – producer, mixing, mastering
Charles Duke – producer
Mecca E – producer
Oscar – producer
Paul "Rudeboy" Okoye - producer
Peter "Mr P" Okoye - producer
Papi J - producer
George Nathaniel – mixing, mastering
Dave Scott – featured artist
Clifford Harris, Jr – featured artist
Michael Ajereh – featured artist
Awilo Longomba – featured artist
Jermaine Jacksun – featured artist
Vtek – featured artist
Kelechi Amadi-Obi – photography
Abinibi – album art

Release history

References 

2014 albums
P-Square albums
Igbo-language albums
Albums produced by Vtek
Albums produced by Oscar (record producer)